HMS Courageous (S50) is a decommissioned  nuclear fleet submarine in service with the Royal Navy from 1971. She is now a museum ship managed by the Devonport Naval Heritage Centre.

In 2021, plans to set up a Cold War Centre around Courageous entered their first phase of implementation, supported by the National Museum of the Royal Navy.

Operational history
In 1982, Courageous along with her sister ship, was sent with the British task force to retake the Falkland Islands from the occupying Argentine forces. She returned home later in the year without damage. Courageous was retired from service in 1992.

During the HMNB Devonport Navy Days 2006, one of the members of the team restoring HMS Courageous pointed out that HMS Valiant was one of the first Royal Navy submarines to have her reactor removed. As Valiant had been cosmetically wrecked by this work, HMS Courageous was selected for the museum ship to represent the nuclear submarine fleet of the Royal Navy during the Cold War. Components were removed from HMS Valiant to restore Courageous. HMS Courageous was due to be moved in 2007 from her current berth to a new berth, due to development of the HMNB Devonport area where she resided.

References

Cited footnotes

Cited texts
 HMS Courageous: A Cold War Veteran. Published by the Courageous Society 2008.

External links
 HMS Courageous Society website

 

Churchill-class submarines
Museum ships in the United Kingdom
Falklands War naval ships of the United Kingdom
1970 ships